Tim Madden, also known professionally as Tim Maxx, is an Australian director, EDM musician, and Music Producer. He is best known for his 2015 single Crash and Burn.

Career 
Madden has directed music videos for Afrojack, Erick Morillo, Vassy, Kryder, Bella Hunter, Robbie Rivera, Jyra, Rumors, Black Summer, JVMIE, Keeda, Cedella Marley, Savi, and Manu Crooks. His music videos have been featured in the Top 10 music videos on YouTube in Australia.

Collaborations and solo career 
In 2015, Madden released his debut single Crash and Burn (Armada Music). The track was played over 380,000 times on Spotify. He also collaborated with fellow Australian electronic musician Jamie Lee Wilson on the track Sticks & Stones.

In 2016, he collaborated with Adam Katz on the track Only You. His music video for Mama Said by Jyra feat. Aye Sones was ranked in the Top 5 Hottest Dance Videos of the Week by Shazam.

In 2017, Madden directed the music video for Young Like Me by Black Summer feat. Lowell (produced by Grammy Award-winner Chris 'Tek' O'Ryan) which launched on national television in Australia on Nine Network. He also created a remix of the Grammy Award-winning Dave Audé & JVMIE track Back 2 Love which ranked No. 3 on the Billboard Dance Club Charts.

Use in media 
Madden's tracks have been featured on network television shows Law & Order, The Voice, The Tonight Show, The X Factor Australia, and Australia's Next Top Model, and in commercials for American Express, Reebok, and Chevy. He has also created brand content for Sydney Festival, Sydney Opera House, Mission Australia, and Bondi Icebergs.

Discography

Filmography

Awards and nominations 
In 2016, Madden was awarded 2nd Place for Electronic dance music in the International Songwriting Competition along with Adam Katz.

In 2017, he was a finalist in the Elton John: The Cut competition held by YouTuber Kurt Schneider to direct Elton John's Tiny Dancer. He also scored the short film Collar (directed by Rowan Maher), which won Best Drama at the Hollywood Boulevard Film Festival 2017.

External links 
 Tim Madden Official Website
 Tim Maxx Official Website
 Tim Maxx on SoundCloud

References 

Living people
Australian electronic musicians
Australian music video directors
Year of birth missing (living people)